The Eurasia Tunnel is a road tunnel in Istanbul, Turkey, crossing underneath the Bosphorus strait. The tunnel was officially opened on 20 December 2016 and opened to traffic on 22 December 2016.

The  double-deck tunnel connects Kumkapı on the European part and Koşuyolu, Kadıköy, on the Asian part of Istanbul with a  route including the tunnel approach roads. It crosses the Bosphorus beneath the seabed at a maximum depth of −. The journey between the two continents takes about 5 minutes. Toll is collected in both directions; since February 2020, ₺36.40 (about $4 US) for cars and ₺54.70 ($6 US) for minibuses. In February 2021 the toll increased by 26% to ₺46 (approx. $6.20) and ₺69 (~$9.30) respectively.

Background

In 1891, French railway engineer Simon Préault presented a preliminary project for an underwater tubular bridge "patented by the Ottoman imperial government", consisting of a submerged bridge supporting a tube where steam trains would run.

The conceptual background of Eurasia Tunnel reaches back to the findings of the 1997 Transportation Master Plan undertaken by Istanbul University on behalf of Istanbul Metropolitan Municipality. Based on this plan, a pre-feasibility study had been conducted in 2003 for a new Bosphorus crossing. According to the results of this study, a road tunnel was recommended as the solution that offered the highest degree of feasibility.

The Ministry of Transportation, Maritime and Communication of Turkey commissioned a feasibility study by Nippon Koei Co. Ltd. in 2005 to assess  route alternatives for a new tunnel crossing. Based on environmental and social criteria, cost and risk factors, the study concluded by supporting the initially proposed route as the preferred option.

The three current bridges across the Bosphorus were taken into consideration in selecting the tunnel's location, which was put farther south to better balance the distribution of traffic between the crossings. Other selection criteria included the route's lower investment cost due to a shorter tunnel length and the availability of sufficient space for construction sites and operational buildings (toll plaza, administrative units). High level assessments based on corridor alternatives that are comprehensively defined in the feasibility study also support the selection of the proposed route in terms of environmental and social costs and risk factors.

Investors
Avrasya Tüneli İşletme İnşaat ve Yatırım A.Ş. (ATAŞ) was founded on  26 October 2009 by the partnership of Yapı Merkezi from Turkey and SK E&C from South Korea.

The build–operate–transfer model adopted at the Eurasia Tunnel, has brought together the private investment dynamism and their project experience, and the support of international financial institutions. The concession lasts 29 years. Partnership contract includes guaranteed minimum revenue and profit sharing for parts exceeding guaranteed revenue.

The European Bank for Reconstruction and Development (EBRD) is supplying a finance package worth US$150 million. Other components of the US$1.245 billion financing package include a $350 million loan from the European Investment Bank (EIB) and financing and guarantees from Export-Import Bank of Korea and K-Sure, also with participation from Sumitomo Mitsui Banking Corporation, Standard Chartered, Mizuho Bank, Türkiye İş Bankası, Garanti Bank and Yapı ve Kredi Bankası. A hedging facility for the transaction is provided by some of the lenders as well as Deutsche Bank.

Project segments
The project consists of three main segments:

European side
Construction of five U-turns as underpasses and seven pedestrian crossings as overpasses along Kennedy Street that stretches between Kazlıçeşme and Sarayburnu as a shoreline road beside the Sea of Marmara.

Bosphorus crossing

Asian side
Widening from 2x3 and 2x4 lanes to 2x4 and 2x5 lanes along an approximately  stretch of the current D100 road that links at Göztepe to Ankara-İstanbul State Highway, and construction of 2 bridge intersections, 1 overpass and 3 pedestrian bridges.

Technical details
The American firm Parsons Brinckerhoff was responsible for the design, while the British Arup Group and American Jacobs Engineering Group undertook the technical and traffic studies and  HNTB provided independent design verification. The geotechnical survey was by the Dutch consultancy Fugro. The tunnel boring machine (TBM) was supplied by the German manufacturer Herrenknecht. The Italian company Italferr was in charge of works management and project review on behalf of Administration. The French company Egis Group will be in charge of the operation and maintenance.

To decrease the seismic stresses/strains below the permissible levels, two flexible seismic joints/segments; with displacement limits of ± for shear and ± for extraction/contraction; were innovated, designed specially, localized through geological/geophysical/geotechnical conditions, tested in laboratory; implemented ‘first time’ in TBM tunnelling under similar severe conditions. The design earthquake magnitude was specified as moment magnitude of 7.25 and design of functional and safety evaluation earthquakes have a return period of 500 and 2,500 years, respectively. Seismic joint locations defined during design phase were verified through continuous monitoring of cutterhead torques.

The  tunnel was excavated and constructed with a  diameter Mixshield Slurry TBM exclusively designed and equipped with the latest } disc cutters (35 pieces monoblock disc cutters, all atmospherically changeable and have individual wearing sensor system), 192 piece cutting knives (only 48 atmospherically changeable), special pressurized locks for divers and material and rescue chamber for all shift members. The utilized TBM ranks first in the world with its  cutterhead power, second with its  pressure design; and sixth with its  excavation area.

Spent direct time for excavation and ringbuild were around 3,500 and 1,700 hours, respectively. Furthermore, 440 disc cutters, 85 scrapers and 475 brushes were replaced by TBM crew and four times hyperbaric maintenance operations (total of 45 days) with specially trained divers (max. under  first time in the world) were successfully performed.

15,048 piece -thick precast segments (1,672 rings) with the high performance (average charge passed is 280 Coulomb (1,000 Coulomb limit) were produced and connected to each other by using 30,765 bolts.

On the other hand, twin tunnels (each has approximately  length) were completed in 445 calendar days with a cross section of  each by classical mining method. Both tunnels met up each other within ± tolerance.

The tunnel is designed so that it has protected emergency areas every  to provide shelter, also escape routes to the other tunnel level. Every  there will be an emergency lane equipped with emergency telephone.

The speed limit in the tunnel route .

A daily average of around 120,000 cars and light vehicles is expected to pass through the tunnel after the first year.

The toll is planned to be Turkish lira equivalent of $4 US plus VAT for cars and $6 US plus VAT for minibuses in each direction. The toll rate will change in accordance with US Consumer Price Index.

See also
 Bosphorus Bridge, also called the First Bosphorus Bridge.
 Bosphorus Strait
 Fatih Sultan Mehmet Bridge, also called the Second Bosphorus Bridge, located about 5 km north of the Bosphorus Bridge.
 Great Istanbul Tunnel, a proposed three-level road-rail undersea tunnel.
 Marmaray, undersea rail tunnel, crossing the Bosphorus and connecting the Asian and European sides of Istanbul.
 Public transport in Istanbul
 Rail transport in Turkey
 Turkish Straits
 Yavuz Sultan Selim Bridge, also called the Third Bosphorus Bridge.

References

External links

 Connecting Continents.  In: All Around, No. 4 / Herrenknecht AG, large-screen pics of the tunnel construction

Undersea tunnels in Europe
Toll tunnels in Turkey
Tunnels in Istanbul
2016 in Istanbul
Bosphorus crossings
Undersea tunnels in Asia
2016 establishments in Turkey
Tunnels completed in 2016
Zeytinburnu
Kadıköy